Nimick is a surname. Notable people with the surname include:

John Nimick (born 1958), American squash player and tournament organizer
William Nimick, Northern Irish ten-pin bowler
William A. Nimick (1848–1907), American Major League Baseball owner